Komonen is a surname. Notable people with the surname include:

Dave Komonen (1898–1978), Finnish-Canadian athlete in marathon
Markku Komonen (born 1945), Finnish architect

See also
Heikkinen – Komonen Architects, Finnish architectural firm